Alan Krause (born 14 August 1931) is a former Australian rules footballer who played with Melbourne in the Victorian Football League (VFL).

References
 Holmesby, Russell & Main, Jim (2007). The Encyclopedia of AFL Footballers. 7th ed. Melbourne: Bas Publishing.

External links

1931 births
Australian rules footballers from Victoria (Australia)
Melbourne Football Club players
Living people